Argavary (also Romanized as Ārgavāry; also known as Sarāb Khomān Arkvāzy (Persian: سراب خمان اركوازئ) and Sarāb Khomān) is a village in Howmeh-ye Shomali Rural District, in the Central District of Eslamabad-e Gharb County, Kermanshah Province, Iran. At the 2006 census, its population was 499, in 102 families.

References 

Populated places in Eslamabad-e Gharb County